Ganga Ki Kasam may refer to:
 Ganga Ki Kasam (1975 film), a Bollywood film
 Ganga Ki Kasam (1999 film), an Indian Hindi-language action film